Amran is a sub-district located in Amran District, 'Amran Governorate, Yemen. Amran had a population of 84669 according to the 2004 census.

References 

Sub-districts in Amran District